Atidarsagene autotemcel, sold under the brand name Libmeldy, is a gene therapy treatment for metachromatic leukodystrophy (MLD) developed by Orchard Therapeutics. It contains an autologous CD34⁺ cell enriched population that contains haematopoietic stem and progenitor cells transduced using a lentiviral vector encoding the human arylsulfatase A (ARSA) gene.

Atidarsagene autotemcel was approved for medical use in the European Union in December 2020, and in the United Kingdom in February 2021.

Medical uses 
Atidarsagene autotemcel is indicated for the treatment of metachromatic leukodystrophy (MLD) characterized by biallelic mutations in the arysulfatase A (ARSA) gene leading to a reduction of the ARSA enzymatic activity in children with late infantile or early juvenile forms, without clinical manifestations of the disease; and in children with the early juvenile form, with early clinical manifestations of the disease, who still  have the ability to walk independently and before the onset of cognitive decline.

Society and culture

Legal status 
Atidarsagene autotemcel was approved for medical use in the European Union in December 2020. It was approved for medical use in the UK in February 2021.

Economics 
In February 2022, it was announced that NHS England would be providing the drug to metachromatic leukodystrophy patients, after negotiating a discount with the manufacturer. The assessment by BeneluxA concluded that it should only be reimbursed if the company offered a significant price reduction. The National Centre for Pharmacoeconomics (NCPE) in Ireland recommends "that atidarsagene autotemcel not be considered for reimbursement unless cost effectiveness can be improved relative to existing treatment."

References 

Gene therapy